KGWC-TV (channel 14) is a television station in Casper, Wyoming, United States, affiliated with CBS. It is owned by Big Horn Television LLC, which maintains a shared services agreement (SSA) with Coastal Television Broadcasting Company LLC, owner of Fox affiliate KFNB (channel 20), for the provision of certain services. Coastal also operates ABC affiliate KTWO-TV (channel 2) under a separate SSA with owner Vision Alaska LLC. The stations share studios on Skyview Drive in Casper, while KGWC-TV's transmitter is located atop Casper Mountain. KGWC-TV is rebroadcast on two satellite stations in western Wyoming: KGWL-TV (channel 5) in Lander and KGWR-TV (channel 13) in Rock Springs (part of the Salt Lake City market).

Channel 14 began broadcasting as KCWY-TV—no relation to the present station with that call sign—in August 1980. Its debut marked the first time Casper had competing television stations since 1959. It struggled against dominant KTWO-TV. The Lander and Rock Springs stations were put on the air in 1982. The local Chrysostom Corporation sold the stations to Stauffer Communications in 1986. The stations received their present call letters and became dependent on KGWN-TV in Cheyenne for most of their news. Under the ownership of Benedek Broadcasting in the late 1990s, full local newscasts from Casper resumed, though staff turnover prompted Benedek to discontinue the local operation once more in 2000.

When Benedek declared bankruptcy, KGWC-TV was sold to a hedge fund which then separated it from the Cheyenne station. The general manager of KFNB, Mark Nalbone, acquired KGWC-TV and used the resources of KTWO-TV, which he also managed, to run channel 14. Nalbone tried to sell the station's assets and CBS affiliation to Gray Television in 2018 but was denied by federal authorities. The Nalbone-owned and managed stations were then sold to their present owners in 2020.

History

Early years
The Chrysostom Corporation, a group of five investors that included the Casper police chief, was formed in 1977 to apply for a license to build a TV station in Casper. The Federal Communications Commission approved the application on August 31, 1979, and KCWY-TV began broadcasting on August 12, 1980. Channel 14, which has been affiliated with CBS since its launch, was the first new television station to go on the air in Casper since 1957 and marked the first time the city had two competing stations since 1959, when KSPR-TV folded. It also was Wyoming's first UHF television station.

The new channel entered into a tough battle with KTWO-TV, with which it was at a constant disadvantage. In its first ratings book, its Action News newscasts attracted two percent of the audience, compared to 59 percent at KTWO. KTWO trumpeted that it aired all 50 of the top 50 programs in Casper.

With the Casper station on air, Chrysostom then began a push to build full-power satellite stations. It filed for the open channel 4 at Lander, which put it in competition with Central Wyoming College's application to build the first educational television station in the state. Channel 5 was found to be available, and both groups received channels. Chrysostom put KOWY on the air in Lander in 1982. At the same time, it bought KTUX-TV, a channel 13 station in Rock Springs that had signed on October 21, 1977, but was silent, and renamed it KWWY-TV. With all three in operation, the group briefly branded as the "Wyoming Action Network".

Sale to Stauffer
The Chrysostom Corporation sold KCWY-TV and its satellites to Stauffer Communications of Topeka, Kansas, in 1986 for $3.5 million. At the same time, Stauffer bought KYCU, the CBS affiliate in Cheyenne. On New Year's Day 1987, the stations adopted new call letters of KGWC-TV, KGWL-TV (Lander), and KGWR-TV (Rock Springs), matching the Cheyenne station, which became KGWN-TV, representing the "Great Western Network". (The KCWY call letters later returned to Casper on channel 13.)

Under Stauffer, cuts were made to the operation in Casper to reduce costs, respond to the weak regional economy, and take advantage of synergies with the Cheyenne station. In early 1987, the station ceased producing its own local weathercasts and began taking legislative and state capitol reports from KGWN; it cut its news department from 11 staff down to 8. Even deeper cuts followed the next year, with six of the remaining eight news positions in Casper eliminated. Viewers in Casper now mostly saw KGWN's news.

Benedek revival
In 1995, Stauffer sold its holdings to Morris Communications. Morris kept the newspapers and spun off the television stations to Benedek Broadcasting of Rockford, Illinois, for $60 million.

Under Benedek's ownership, KGWC received significant investment and increased the visibility of its product, running billboards and TV advertisements for its newscasts. In December 1996, it poached Rich Bircumshaw from KTWO radio to serve as the news director and KTWO-TV news director Vicki Daniels as assignment editor. It added weekend newscasts and doubled its staff. Benedek leased an electronics store building on CY Avenue to serve as the station's studios and outfitted it with $500,000 in new equipment, improving the technical quality of its broadcasts.

However, the product failed to be viable in the long run for Benedek. The news department's size slowly shrank, and the station had three general managers in less than two years. On June 4, 2000, the entire Casper operation, except for an engineer, was shuttered and the station turned into a satellite of KGWN. The vice president of KGWN-TV noted that, despite good ratings, poor personnel and "management problems" made a closure necessary; Benedek vowed to restore news but did not give a timetable.

Chelsey ownership and sale to Mark III Media
After the closure of the KGWC-TV operation, financial problems developed at Benedek. The early 2000s recession reduced ad sales and caused the company to be unable to pay interest on a set of bonds issued in 1996, prompting a filing for Chapter 11 bankruptcy. While many Benedek stations were sold to Gray Television, some—including KGWC-TV and KGWN-TV—went to Chelsey Broadcasting, an affiliate of the Chelsey Capital hedge fund.

In 2003, Chelsey Broadcasting divested its Wyoming stations in two separate sales. KGWN and Scottsbluff, Nebraska, satellite KSTF were sold to SagamoreHill Broadcasting, while KGWC, KGWL, and KGWR were sold separately to Mark III Media, headed by Mark Nalbone, general manager of Casper Fox affiliate KFNB. Nalbone also served as a consultant to KTWO-TV. The sale languished during a lengthy approval process at the FCC due to several objections, primarily concerning whether the sale would effectively put the stations under common ownership with KFNB and KTWO-TV. Mark III programmed KGWC separately from KGWN under a time brokerage agreement.

Mark III resurrected a local newscast in 2004, which shared reporting resources with KTWO-TV. KTWO sponsored an "Anchorman for a Day" contest, which was won by Marvin Nolte, a retired man from Bar Nunn with no previous broadcasting experience; he wound up getting a permanent position after one of KGWC-TV's anchors moved to Cheyenne. However, the program failed to make headway in the ratings against KTWO and KCWY, which had begun a local newscast in 2003, and was canceled on January 3, 2006.

Gray sale attempt and sale to Big Horn
Mark III Media announced the sale of KGWC-TV to Gray Television, owner of KCWY-DT and KGWN, on February 12, 2018. Under the terms of the deal, the KGWC license was to be donated to a non-profit organization and would receive a new call sign and virtual channel number; on March 6, 2018, Gray agreed to donate the license and transmitter to Central Wyoming College, operator of the Wyoming PBS network. Central Wyoming College planned to convert channel 14 into a non-commercial license, with the station being used to broadcast their PBS Kids subchannel full-time in high definition (which is currently unavailable in the area via Wyoming PBS station KPTW). CWC reserved the call sign KEWY for the station. Gray would have retained the KGWC call letters and CBS programming, moving them to its low power KCBZ-LD, formerly KSBF-LD (channel 36); per the donation agreement, KCBZ-LD was to have taken the virtual channel 14 to maintain CBS programming on channel 14. Gray would have acquired and retained KGWR-TV and KGWL-TV. The sale of KGWC-TV and its satellites was canceled in October 2018; on January 24, 2019, Gray disclosed that its acquisition of the CBS affiliation had been blocked by the Department of Justice (DOJ). This came primarily because the DOJ regarded KGWL in Lander as a Casper station, and Casper has too few stations for an outright television duopoly.

On October 8, 2019, Mark III Media announced that it would sell KGWC-TV and its satellites to Big Horn Television (run by Michael Hogan); the sale was concurrent with Vision Alaska's purchase of KTWO-TV and Coastal Television Broadcasting Company's purchase of KFNB. The sale was completed on June 1, 2020.

Technical information

Subchannels
The stations' signals are multiplexed:

Analog-to-digital transition
KGWL and KGWR began broadcasting digital television service by February 2009, when they ceased analog service. KGWC had operated a digital signal on channel 15 for some time before then but moved it to channel 14 after shutting down its analog transmitter.

Repeaters

Satellite stations

Translators
The signal of KGWC-TV (or its satellites) is additionally rebroadcast over the following translators:

 Big Piney, etc.: K32JN-D
 Bondurant: K17JZ-D (KGWR-TV) 
 Clareton: K28KM-D
 Douglas: K11RN-D
 Gillette: K16AE-D
 Pinedale: K18JA-D
 Sheridan: K26LW-D
 Shoshoni: K13NZ-D
 Wyodak: K30MX-D

Notes

References

External links

CBS network affiliates
Television channels and stations established in 1980
1980 establishments in Wyoming
GWC-TV
Casper, Wyoming